Columbus is a science laboratory that is part of the International Space Station (ISS) and is the largest single contribution to the ISS made by the European Space Agency (ESA).

Like the Harmony and Tranquility modules, the Columbus laboratory was constructed in Turin, Italy by Thales Alenia Space. The functional equipment and software of the lab was designed by EADS in Bremen, Germany. It was also integrated in Bremen before being flown to the Kennedy Space Center (KSC) in Florida in an Airbus Beluga. It was launched aboard  on February 7, 2008, on flight STS-122. It is designed for ten years of operation.  The module is controlled by the Columbus Control Centre, located at the German Space Operations Center, part of the German Aerospace Center in Oberpfaffenhofen near Munich, Germany.

The European Space Agency has spent €1.4 billion (about US$2 billion) on building Columbus, including the experiments it carries and the ground control infrastructure necessary to operate them.

History 

The structure used for Columbus is based on the MPLM module built for NASA by Thales Alenia Space. In 2000 the pre-integrated module (structure including harness and tubing) was delivered to Bremen in Germany by the Co-prime contractor Alenia. The final integration and system testing was performed by the overall prime contractor EADS Astrium Space Transportation, after that the initial Payload was integrated and the overall complement checked-out.

On May 27, 2006 Columbus was flown from Bremen, Germany to Kennedy Space Center on board an Airbus Beluga.

The final schedule was much longer than originally planned due to development problems (several caused by the complex responsibility splitting between the Co-prime and the Overall prime contractor) and design changes introduced by ESA but being affordable due to the Shuttle problems delaying the Columbus launch for several years. The main design change was the addition of the External Payload Facility (EPF), which was driven by the different European Payload organizations being more interested in outer space than internal experiments. Also the addition of a terminal for direct communications to/from ground, which could have been used also as back-up for the ISS system, was studied but not implemented for cost reasons.

Construction 
ESA chose EADS Astrium Space Transportation as prime contractor for Columbus overall design, verification and integration.  The Columbus structure, the micro-meteorite protection system, the active and passive thermal control, the environmental control, the harness and all the related ground support equipment were designed and qualified by Alcatel Alenia Space in Turin, Italy as defined by the PICA – Principle (for definition see History below); the related hardware was pre-integrated and sent as PICA in September 2001 to Bremen. The lab was built and qualified on system level at the EADS Astrium Space Transportation facilities in Bremen, Germany, from where it was sent to NASA.

Launch, berthing and outfitting 

In November 2007, Columbus was moved out of the KSC Space Station Processing Facility, and installed into the payload bay of the Atlantis orbiter for launch on ISS assembly flight 1E (STS-122).

STS-122 launch delays
During cryo-filling of the Space Shuttle External Tank (ET) with liquid hydrogen and liquid oxygen prior to the first launch attempt on December 6, 2007, two of four LH2 ECO sensors failed a test. Mission rules called for at least three of the four sensors to be in working order for a launch attempt to proceed. As a result of the failure, the Launch Director Doug Lyons postponed the launch, initially for 24 hours. This was later revised into a 72-hour delay, resulting in a next launch attempt set for Sunday December 9, 2007. This launch attempt was scrubbed when one of the ECO sensors again failed during fuelling.

The ECO sensors' external connector was changed on the Space Shuttle external tank, causing a two-month delay in the launch. Columbus was finally launched successfully on the third attempt at 2:45pm EST, February 7, 2008.

Berthing 
Once at the station, Canadarm2 removed Columbus from the docked shuttle's cargo bay
and attached it to the starboard hatch of Harmony (also known as Node 2),
with the cylinder pointing outwards on February 11, 2008.

Description 
The laboratory is a cylindrical module, made from stainless steel, kevlar and hardened aluminum, with two end cones. Its shape is very similar to that of the Multi-Purpose Logistics Modules (MPLMs),
since both were designed to fit in the cargo bay of a Space Shuttle orbiter. The starboard end cone contains most of the laboratory's on-board computers. The port end cone contains the Common Berthing Mechanism.

Specifications 

 Length: 
 Diameter: 
 Total mass: 
 Total payload mass 
 Total on-orbit mass 
 Construction details:
 Wall thickness 4mm
 welded end cones
 materials : Stainless steel, kevlar, aluminium

Research activities and payloads 

Activities in the lab are controlled on the ground by the Columbus Control Center (at DLR Oberpfaffenhofen in Germany) and by the associated User Support Operations Centres throughout Europe.

The laboratory can accommodate ten active International Standard Payload Racks (ISPRs) for science payloads.
Agreements with NASA allocate to ESA 51% usage of the Columbus Laboratory.
ESA is thus allocated five active rack locations, with the other five being allocated to NASA.
Four active rack locations are on the forward side of the deck, four on the aft side, and two are in overhead locations.
Three of the deck racks are filled with life support and cooling systems.
The remaining deck rack and the two remaining overhead racks are storage racks.

In addition, four un-pressurized payload platforms can be attached outside the starboard cone, on the Columbus External Payload Facility (CEPF).

The following European ISPRs have been initially installed inside Columbus:
 Fluid Science Laboratory (FSL)
 European Physiology Modules (EPM)
 Biolab
 European Drawer Rack (EDR)
 European Stowage Rack

The first external payloads were mounted on Columbus by crew members of the mission STS-122 mission. The three payloads mounted are:
 European Technology Exposure Facility (EuTEF) platform, which accommodates nine instruments: TRIBOLAB, PLEGPAY, MEDET, EUFIDE, DEBIE-2, FIPEX, EUTEMP, EXPOSE, DOSTEL, and the Earth Viewing Camera.
 Solar Monitoring Observatory (SOLAR)
 MISSE-6 (NASA payload)

Planned additional external payloads:
 Atomic Clock Ensemble in Space (ACES)
 EXPORT
 Atmosphere-Space Interaction Monitor (ASIM)
 European Data Relay Satellite (EDRS) Communications Terminal, Ka-band

In 2014 the ISS-RapidScat instrument was installed, which was operated until late 2016. ISS-RapidScat was transported to ISS by the SpaceX CRS-4 spaceflight.

See also
 European Transportation Carrier (ISS Facility) (ETC)
 Columbus – External Payload Facility (Columbus-EPF)
 Bartolomeo facility

References

External links 

 ESA: Columbus Laboratory
 ESA: Technical specifications of the Columbus Laboratory
 ESA: Columbus structure completed
 

 
Components of the International Space Station
Spacecraft launched in 2008
Laboratories
Spacecraft launched by the Space Shuttle